Elevator Musiq is the third album released by New Zealand hip-hop group, Nesian Mystik on 28 October 2008 by Bounce/Universal Records.
Album art work was done by New Zealand Street artist Misery. Guest Artists include PNC, Young Sid and Che Fu.

The album peaked at #12 on the New Zealand Top 40 charts.

Track listing
"Can't Stop The Progress"
"Home Coming"
"Come And Get It"
"Damn"
"Just Be Me"
"Magazine Dreams"
"R.S.V.P" ft. PNC
"You Already Know" ft Young Sid
"I Don't Usually"
"Prospect"
"Mr Mista"
"Break Drop Flow"
"Nesian 101"
"Dance Floor"
"Game Over"

Singles chart performance

References

External links
 Elevator Musiq at Nesian-mystik.com

Nesian Mystik albums
2008 albums